Nurbek Oralbay (Nūrbek Oralbai; born 11 June 2000) is a Kazakh amateur boxer who won gold medal at the 2018 Youth World Championships in the middleweight division.

He is the twin brother of fellow boxer Aibek Oralbay.

References

External links

Living people
2000 births
Kazakhstani male boxers
Light-heavyweight boxers
Sportspeople from Astana
Twin sportspeople
Kazakhstani twins
21st-century Kazakhstani people